Sukha Bose (1 November 1930 – 12 October 2008) was an Indian cricket umpire. He stood in one Test match, India vs. Pakistan, in 1983 and two ODI games between 1983 and 1984.

See also
 List of Test cricket umpires
 List of One Day International cricket umpires
 Pakistani cricket team in India in 1983–84

References

1930 births
2008 deaths
Indian Test cricket umpires
Indian One Day International cricket umpires
People from Jamshedpur